The 2016–17 Deportivo Alavés season is the club's 95th year in existence and its 12th season in the top flight of Spanish football. Alavés is involved in two competitions after promoting from the Segunda División during the last season.

Squad

Competitions

Overall

Overview

La Liga

League table

Results summary

Matches

Copa del Rey

Round of 32

Round of 16

Quarter-finals

Semi-finals

Final

Statistics

Appearances and goals
Last updated on 27 May 2017.

|-
! colspan=14 style=background:#dcdcdc; text-align:center|Goalkeepers

|-
! colspan=14 style=background:#dcdcdc; text-align:center|Defenders

|-
! colspan=14 style=background:#dcdcdc; text-align:center|Midfielders

|-
! colspan=14 style=background:#dcdcdc; text-align:center|Forwards

|-
! colspan=14 style=background:#dcdcdc; text-align:center| Players who have made an appearance or had a squad number this season but have left the club

|-
|}

References

External links

Deportivo Alavés seasons
2016–17 La Liga
Alaves